Positif may refer to:

Positif (album), 1984 album by Jean-Jacques Goldman
"Positif" (song), 2012 song by  Matt Houston and P-Square
Positif (magazine), French film magazine, founded in 1952 
Positif, known name for the Positive organ

See also
Positive (disambiguation)